Janin Lindenberg (born 20 January 1987) is a German athlete who specialises in the 400 metres.  She was born in Berlin. Lindenberg represented Germany in the 4 x 400 metres at the 2012 Summer Olympics.

Achievements

References 

 

1987 births
Living people
Athletes from Berlin
German female sprinters
German national athletics champions
Athletes (track and field) at the 2012 Summer Olympics
Olympic athletes of Germany
European Athletics Championships medalists
Olympic female sprinters